Andrew Francis Slaughter (born 29 September 1960) is a British Labour Party politician serving as Member of Parliament (MP) for Hammersmith, previously Ealing, Acton and Shepherd's Bush, since 2005. He had previously served as Leader of the London Borough of Hammersmith and Fulham Council.

Parliamentary career
He stood at the Uxbridge by-election in July 1997, following the unexpected death seven days after the 1997 general election of incumbent Sir Michael Shersby. The seat, which had a small Conservative majority, was held for the Conservatives by John Randall.

At the 2005 general election, Slaughter was elected as the member of parliament for Ealing, Acton and Shepherd's Bush in London, retaining the seat for Labour following the retirement of his predecessor, Clive Soley.

Andy Slaughter is currently a member of the Justice Select Committee. He was a member of the Communities and Local Government Select Committee in 2009–10 and in 2010 of the London Regional Select Committee and Joint Committee on Human Rights. Previously he was member of the Regulatory Reform Select Committee (2005–07) and Children, Schools and Families Select Committee (2007–09).

Slaughter's interests include the Middle East and particularly Palestine. He is Secretary of the Britain-Palestine All-Party Parliamentary Group (APPG) and Vice-Chair of Labour Friends of Palestine and the Middle East. His interests are reflected in the other APPGs of which he is a member, including Democracy and Human Rights in the Gulf, Fire Safety and Rescue, Gypsies, Travellers and Roma, Heathrow, and Legal Aid.

He has spoken in the House of Commons on fire safety, housing, legal aid, local government, education and climate change issues.

Slaughter has campaigned against Heathrow expansion. He also played a part in successful local campaigns against the planned demolition of social housing by the Conservative Council in his constituency and the planned demolition of Charing Cross Hospital.

The Ealing, Acton and Shepherd's Bush constituency underwent a boundary change for the 2010 general election, and on 30 November 2006, the new Hammersmith Constituency Labour Party selected Slaughter as the Labour candidate for the new Hammersmith seat which he won in the 2010 general election with an increased majority.

In government
He was appointed Parliamentary Private Secretary (PPS) to Stephen Ladyman MP, Minister of State for the Department for Transport and served from November 2005 to June 2007. In June 2007, he was appointed PPS to Lord Malloch-Brown, Minister of State at the Foreign and Commonwealth Office, and also served as PPS to Lord Digby Jones, Minister of State at the Foreign and Commonwealth Office and Department for Business, Enterprise and Regulatory Reform, and between July 2007 and October 2008.

On 27 January 2009, he resigned his PPS role as he opposed the Government's plans for a third runway at Heathrow Airport.

In opposition
In October 2010, Slaughter was invited to join the Labour frontbench as Shadow Justice Minister with responsibility for courts and tribunals, criminal law, freedom of information, the legal profession, civil justice reform and Legal Aid. Slaughter served as the lead shadow minister opposing the Legal Aid, Sentencing and Punishment of Offenders Act 2012 and the Justice and Security Act 2012. He resigned in June 2016, citing concerns over Jeremy Corbyn's leadership. He supported Owen Smith in the 2016 Labour Party (UK) leadership election. He was appointed as Shadow Minister for Housing in October 2016, however he was sacked from the frontbench in June 2017 after he voted in favour of an amendment to the Queen's Speech which called on the UK to remain in the European Single Market, in defiance of the Labour whip.

In the November 2021 British shadow cabinet reshuffle, he became the new Shadow Solicitor General.

References

External links
 
 Local Labour Party
 Guardian Unlimited Politics – Ask Aristotle: Andrew Slaughter MP
 
 Andrew Slaughter's Chambers
 Ealing Gazette newspaper column written by Andrew Slaughter and other Ealing MPs
 Ealing Times newspaper column written by Andrew Slaughter and other Ealing MPs until 2008
 BBC Politics 

1960 births
Living people
Labour Party (UK) MPs for English constituencies
Councillors in the London Borough of Hammersmith and Fulham
People educated at Latymer Upper School
Alumni of the University of Exeter
People from Hammersmith
People from Fulham
UK MPs 2005–2010
UK MPs 2010–2015
UK MPs 2015–2017
UK MPs 2017–2019
UK MPs 2019–present
British republicans